The Leyland Titan is a rear-engined double-decker bus manufactured by Leyland between 1977 and 1984, primarily for London Transport.

Development

The Titan was conceived in 1973 as project B15 and was intended as a replacement for the Bristol VRT, Daimler Fleetline and Leyland Atlantean. Following the success of the single-decker Leyland National, it was decided, from the outset, that the vehicle would be very standardised and of integral construction. This allowed more flexibility in the location of mechanical components and allowed a reduced step-height. The move away from body-on-chassis construction caused concern for the bodybuilders, who had already lost market share to the Leyland National. Talks regarding licensing agreements were held with Alexander and Northern Counties, both major suppliers to their respective local markets, but no agreements were reached. 

Leyland saw London Transport (LT) as a major market, so the specification was heavily influenced by their preferences. LT was suffering problems with its Daimler/Leyland Fleetline one-person-operated double-deckers and wanted more input into the design. Leyland, too wanted to gain more operator input than had been the case with the Leyland National.

Five prototypes (B15.01-B15.05) were constructed between 1975 and 1977, two of which were evaluated in London.

Specification
The main body structure was aluminium and the body was assembled using Avdel 'Avdelok' rivets similar to the Leyland National. Single and dual-door layouts were offered, with a number of options for the location of the staircase. Mechanically, independent front suspension and a drop-centre rear axle were used, with air suspension and power hydraulic brakes as standard. The prototype engine was a turbocharged version of the Leyland 500 series, although this was changed to Gardner 6LXB for production, as a result of customer preference and concerns over fuel economy and reliability of the 500 series. The Leyland TL11 engine was available for later production versions. The engine was mounted vertically at the rear, with the radiator located separately in a compartment above the engine. This led to an unusual off-centre square rear window. The overall design was advanced for the time and improved on noise and emission requirements by considerable margins.

Production
The Titan name, previously used for a front-engined double-decker, was revived for production in June 1977. It was intended that Park Royal Vehicles would build the first 100 vehicles, with production then transferring to AEC in Southall. This caused industrial relations problems at Park Royal and some 200 skilled craftspeople left. Production was very slow and the first vehicle was not delivered until August 1978.

In October 1978, Leyland announced the AEC factory would close, with the intention of keeping Titan production at Park Royal. The very slow production rate continued, causing cancellation of a number of existing orders. The industrial relations problems continued, as Leyland sought to replace the skilled staff, who had left, with semi-skilled workers. Finally, Leyland announced in October 1979 that Park Royal would close in May 1980. Once this decision had been made and a productivity-related redundancy package negotiated, production increased dramatically. Whereas Park Royal had taken 14 months to build the first 100 vehicles, it took just seven months to build the final 150.

Efforts to transfer production to Eastern Coach Works in Lowestoft failed, again due to difficult industrial relations, so it was finally decided that production would recommence at an expanded facility in Workington, which also built the Leyland National. It took almost a year to expand the facility, transfer the jigs and tooling from Park Royal and recommence production. The continued delays caused the loss of further orders.

Besides the production difficulties, other aspects of the Titan specification, which was strongly influenced by London Transport, were unpopular. Outside London, the Greater Manchester PTE bought 15 (against an original order of 190) and the West Midlands PTE bought five (against an original order of 80) which were later sold to London Transport. The first deliveries for each operator were displayed at the 1978 British Motor Show at the National Exhibition Centre in Birmingham. Reading Transport bought two Park Royal Titans to full London specification and a further 10 from Workington, five of which had high-ratio rear axles and coach seats for express services into London. However planned orders for Greater Glasgow PTE, Lothian Regional Transport, Maidstone & District, Merseyside Transport, Southend Transport and Tyne & Wear Transport were eventually cancelled and simply never got built due to these delays.

One was exported to Hong Kong and entered service with China Motor Bus. A demonstrator, built in 1982, failed to secure any further orders, operators preferring the flexibility and lower cost of the Leyland Olympian. This vehicle was eventually sold to a Scottish independent operator, Ian Glass of Haddington.

London's orders were split between the Titan and the MCW Metrobus but production of Titan for London alone was proving uneconomic. Strong pressure was brought to bear to increase the Titan share of the London orders. As a result, Leyland received the entire order for 275 vehicles in 1982. This led to layoffs at Metro Cammell Weymann. The 1983 order also favoured Leyland, with 210 Titan and 150 Metrobuses. The decision was made to end production, upon completion of a final batch of 240 ordered in 1984, with Leyland focusing on the Olympian.

In London
The orders from London Transport were as follows:
1979: 100 (T1–100)
1980: 150 (T101–250) — reduced from 250 due to industrial relations difficulties at Park Royal
1981: 150 (T251–400)
1982: 275 (T401–675)
1983: 210 (T676–885)
1984: 240 (T886–1125)

The first production Titans were delivered in August 1978 and entered service at Hornchurch in December 1978 on routes 165, 246 and 252. The Titan's London Transport service career saw it working in the eastern and south eastern half of the capital, though a surplus of the type following tendering reverses in the later 1980s, saw Titans spread to some north London garages.

Withdrawals began in December 1992, with large numbers passing to other operators. The most significant user of former London Titans was Merseyside's largest bus operator Merseybus who entered into an agreement with London Buses to purchase 250 from the end of 1992 to 1994. Many of these were extensively refurbished and replaced time expired Leyland Atlantean's within the Merseybus fleet which by the mid-1990s were over 20 years old. Initially concentrated at the Merseybus depot at Gillmoss in North Liverpool parent company MTL Trust Holdings Ltd also transferred ex-London Titans to Merseyside from its MTL London division and ultimately approximately 400 ex-London Titans came to Merseyside with Merseybus and the other companies within MTL as well as many other bus companies within the Merseyside region like Aintree Coachlines, Avon Buses, GTL, Liverpool City Coaches/Citybus, Merseyline Travel and Village Group. A few of these Merseyside operators also used ex-Greater Manchester and West Midlands Titans as well and Village Group also operated the B15 prototype NHG732P for a brief period during 1997-98 before being acquired by MTL in 1998. Other users of ex-London Titans around this time included Oxford Bus Company and Kinchbus. Further buses remained on London work under the ownership of independent contractors such as London Suburban Buses, London & Country, BTS and London Coaches (later Atlas Bus). One of the final Titan deliveries, fleet T990, was destroyed in the Aldwych bus bombing in 1996.

Upon the privatisation of the London Buses subsidiaries, the remaining Titans were distributed between London Central, Stagecoach East London and Stagecoach Selkent. The latter pair began cascading their Titans away almost immediately, spreading them throughout the country. Stagecoach East London's last Titans were withdrawn in September 2001 and Selkent's in November 2001, leaving London Central with a small number of spare buses which were eventually whittled down. Amid a small ceremony, the last one, T1018 was retired from route 40 on 19 June 2003.

Titans today
In London, the low emission zone saw the last Blue Triangle and Sullivan Buses Titans withdrawn; the Big Bus Company had completely replaced all its Titans by June 2009. 

Outside London, they have all been withdrawn since due to them not being DDA Compliant. Stagecoach, who acquired a large number of the type by buying East London and Selkent in 1994, now only have preserved examples of the type.

Some of the Titans went abroad, such as New York City, Las Vegas or Florida in the US, Melbourne, Australia and a couple went to New Zealand. They also function as open-top sightseeing buses.

References

External links

Double-decker buses
Titan
Vehicles introduced in 1978